"Never Could Toe the Mark" is a song written and recorded by American country music artist Waylon Jennings.  It was released in June 1984 as the first single and title track from the album Never Could Toe the Mark  The song reached number 6 on the Billboard Hot Country Singles & Tracks chart. A music video was made for it at a live taping on May 15, 1984 at the Tennessee Performing Arts Center and was released on June 1, 1984.

Chart performance

References

1984 singles
Waylon Jennings songs
Songs written by Waylon Jennings
RCA Records singles
1984 songs